Walsall Integrated Sexual Health Services (WiSH) is a part of the UK National Health Service that provides sexual healthcare in the Walsall area of the UK. The services include the treatment and prevention of sexually transmitted infections, contraception and participation in the National Chlamydia Screening Programme. All services are free and confidential and are available to UK and European Community nationals regardless of age. Since 1 April 2013, Walsall Council (the Local Authority) has been responsible for commissioning the service as part of their public health responsibilities. The funding comes from their allocated public health grant from the UK government.

The service operates from The Centre for Sexual Health at Walsall Manor Hospital. An internet based postal-testing service is also  available. The WiSH clinic at 36 Navigation Street, Walsall was permanently closed by Walsall Council on 30 August 2019 — just under three years since its opening. The closure represents a reduction of £500,000 in the Council's commitment to Sexual Health Services in Walsall.

References

Health in the West Midlands (county)
Human sexuality organizations